Central Jail Multan is a prominent jail in Multan, Pakistan.

History
The jail was built in 1930. It was constructed with a view to confine long-term and lifetime prisoners of Multan Region and to function as the Headquarter Jail for subordinate jail staffers of the region. After the creation of four regions of jails in the province of Punjab stationed at Lahore, Rawalpindi, Multan and Faisalabad, the role of Headquarter Jail has been shifted from the Superintendent of Central / Headquarter Jail Faisalabad to the regional Deputy Inspector General of Prisons in the year 2004. Indian RAW agent Ravinder Kaushik sahid and was buried inside the jail.

Prison industries
The following prison industries are functioning in the jail to train the convicted prisoners in various trades and handicrafts so that they could earn their living after release form jail, utilise prison labour in profitable works for the benefit of the state exchequer, and keep the prisoners busy doing useful tasks.

 Convicted Prisoners' Uniform Weaving and Tailoring / Stitching Unit
 Carpet Knitting Unit

In addition to this, vocational training also functions at Central Multan. The following are four courses that are known to occur:

 Motor Winding
 Electric Home Appliance Repair
 Welding
 Motorcycle Mechanic

See also
 Government of Punjab, Pakistan
 Punjab Prisons (Pakistan)
 Prison Officer
 Headquarter Jail
 National Academy for Prisons Administration
 Punjab Prisons Staff Training Institute

References

External links
 Official Website of Punjab Prisons (Pakistan)

Prisons in Pakistan
Multan